Metbank, formerly known as Metropolitan Bank of Zimbabwe, is a commercial bank in Zimbabwe. It is licensed by the Reserve Bank of Zimbabwe, the central bank and national banking regulator.

Location
The headquarters and main branch of Metbank are located in Metropolitan House, at 3 Central Avenue, in Harare the capital and largest city of Zimbabwe. The geographical coordinates of the bank's headquarters are: 17°49'31.0"S, 31°03'02.0"E (Latitude:-17.825278; Longitude:31.050556).

Overview
Metbank serves large corporations, small to medium enterprises (SMEs), as well as individuals. The bank partners with MasterCard to issue debit and credit cards. , Metbank was a medium-sized financial services provider, with an asset base of US$200.7 million, with shareholders' equity of US$55.9 million.

Metbank Limited has been involved with the introduction of digital banking, branchless banking, and internet banking and agency banking, while keeping the number of brick-and-mortar branches low. As of February 2018, Metbank had a network of banking agents numbering over 150, both inside and outside Zimbabwe. Many of these agents are women and youth, who otherwise would be unemployed.

Ownership
According to the website of the Reserve Bank of Zimbabwe, the major shareholders in the stock of the bank include the following:

Branch network
, Metbank maintains a network of branches at the following locations:

 Main Branch: Metropolitan House, 3 Central Avenue, Harare
 Bulawayo Branch: Meikles Building, Corner Jason Moyo/ Leopold Takawira Bulawayo
 Gweru Branch: Shop No. 1 & 2 Bahadaur Centre, Main Street, Gweru
 Mutare Branch: Shop 1, Zimre Centre, Corner of Herbert Chitepo Street and 5th Street, Mutare

Governance
The chairperson of the bank's board of directors is Dr. Linda Chipunza, a non-executive director. The managing director is Belmont Ndebele.

See also
List of banks in Zimbabwe
Reserve Bank of Zimbabwe
Economy of Zimbabwe

References

External links
Homepage of Metbank
Website of Reserve Bank of Zimbabwe

Banks of Zimbabwe
Banks established in 1999
1999 establishments in Zimbabwe